Alessandro Garbisi (born 11 April 2002) is an Italian professional rugby union player who primarily plays scrum-half for Benetton of the United Rugby Championship.

Professional career 
Garbisi has previously played for clubs such as Mogliano in the past. He signed for Benetton in June 2021 ahead of the 2021–22 United Rugby Championship on a dual-contract from Top10 side Mogliano. He made his debut in Round 6 of the 2021–22 season against .

In 2021 and 2022 Garbisi was named in Italy U20s squad for the Six Nations Under 20s Championship.

On 30 May 2022 he was selected by Kieran Crowley to be part of an Italy 33-man squad for the 2022 mid-year rugby union tests and won his first cap on 1 July 2022 in Bucharest also scoring a try during the test match Italy won 45-13 against Romania.
In occasion of the said match he and his older brother Paolo are the first couple of brothers since 2014 to appear in the same game sheet of the Italian national team after Mauro and Mirco Bergamasco.

References

External links 

2002 births
Living people
Italian rugby union players
Benetton Rugby players
Rugby union scrum-halves
Mogliano Rugby players
Italy international rugby union players